Memnun Hadžić (born 20 January 1981) is a former boxer from Bosnia and Herzegovina. As amateur he reached quarterfinals at the 2005 Mediterranean Games in Almeria and won bronze medal at the 2008 European Amateur Boxing Championships in Liverpool, UK. In december 2009 he became professional.

Highlights 
 European championships, Liverpool, UK, November 2008:
 1/8: Bye
 1/4: Defeated Rok Urbanc (Slovenia) 5:2
 1/2: Lost to Denis Sergeev (Russia) AB 3

 Memorijal Hakija Turajlić, Sarajevo, Bosnia and Herzegovina, June 2003:
 1/2: Defeated Khaled Mustafa el-Sadik (Qatar) 14:2
 Finals: Defeated Dimitar Stoymenov (Bulgaria) 10:0

 Memorijal Hakija Turajlić, Sarajevo, Bosnia and Herzegovina, June 2005:
 1/2: Defeated Ibrahim Hassan al-Zaabi (United Arab Emirates) RSCO 2
 Finals: Defeated Tomislav Antelj (Serbia and Montenegro) 10:5

 Memorijal Hakija Turajlić, Sarajevo, Bosnia and Herzegovina, June 2009:
 1/2: Defeated Abdul Rahman Ramadan (Kuwait) AB 3
 Finals: Defeated Goran Despotović (Serbia) 10:1

 Arena Cup, Pula, Croatia, May 2009:
 1/4: Defeated Zsolt Bogdan (Hungary) 10:5
 1/2: Lost to Razvan Cojanu (Romania) 8:3

References 

1981 births
Living people
Sportspeople from Sarajevo
Bosnia and Herzegovina male boxers
Heavyweight boxers
Competitors at the 2005 Mediterranean Games
Mediterranean Games competitors for Bosnia and Herzegovina